Faculty of Aviation Engineering and Technology (Arabic:كلية هندسة وتكنولوجيا الطيران) is an Engineering Faculty in Giza, Egypt. It is a Private Faculty that belongs to the Ministry Of Civil Aviation in Egypt & Ministry Of Higher Education under the academic supervision of Faculty of Engineering, Cairo University .

External links
 official website
 https://web.facebook.com/aviation.iaet/  Facebook page

Buildings and structures in Giza
Universities in Egypt